The Ptolemaic governors of Cyprus ruled the island on behalf of the Ptolemaic Kingdom, from the abolition of the traditional kingdoms on the island in 312 BC until the conquest of the island by the Romans.

First period (312–306 BC) 
The governors in this period are referred to as strategos (general) in literary sources, but as basileus (king) on their coinage.

Ptolemy lost Cyprus to Demetrius Poliorcetes after the Battle of Salamis in 306 BC.

Second period (287–217 BC)
Cyprus was regained by Ptolemy after the death of Demetrius Poliorcetes in 287, but there is no certain evidence for a governor of Cyprus for the rest of his reign, or during the reigns of his successors, Ptolemy II Philadelphus (283–246 BC) and Ptolemy III Euergetes (246–222 BC). The office may or may not have existed.

Third period (217–58 BC) 
During this period, the governors of Cyprus bore the title of strategos kai archiereus (general and high priest). After 142 BC, they also bore the title of nauarchos (admiral). Governors usually held the rank of syngenes (royal kinsman) in the aulic titulature. The order and dates are according to Roger Bagnall.

Fourth period (40s–30 BC)

See also
 Hellenistic Cyprus

References

Bibliography
 

Cyprus
Ptolemaic governors